George D. Barrows (New York, February 7, 1914 – Oxnard, October 17, 1994) was an American actor known for playing Ro-Man in the film Robot Monster. He was the son of actor Henry A. Barrows. He often wore a gorilla suit for his film roles. Excluding his gorilla roles, Barrows usually played bit parts in films and was rarely credited for his work.

Barrows built the gorilla suit he used in Robot Monster, Gorilla at Large, and other films. It is currently in the collection of the Natural History Museum of Los Angeles County.

Filmography

References

External links 
 

1914 births
1994 deaths
American male film actors
20th-century American male actors
Male actors from New York City